Huntingtown may refer to:

Places
Huntingtown, Connecticut, United States of America
Huntingtown, Maryland,  United States of America
Huntingtown High School, in the above community

See also

Huntingdon (disambiguation)
Huntington (disambiguation)